Peter Hodgkinson (born 18 October 1940 in Worcester, England) is a British architect. His entire career since 1966 has been at Ricardo Bofill Taller de Arquitectura, of which he was a senior partner until 2020. Within the collective structure of the Taller under Ricardo Bofill's continued leadership, he has been a leader in the design of many iconic buildings, such as Walden 7 in Sant Just Desvern and both terminals of Josep Tarradellas Barcelona–El Prat Airport.

Life

Born in England, Hodgkinson received his degree from the Architectural Association School of Architecture (AA) in London. While in London he was close to members of Team 10 and Archigram, and had experience of working with Ron Herron, one of his professors at AA.

He graduated in 1966. He decided to move to Barcelona and join the Taller.

See also
 Ricardo Bofill
 Jean-Pierre Carniaux
 Nabil Gholam

Notes

British architects
British neoclassical architects